The Most Excellent Order of the Star of Sarawak(lit: 'Darjah Yang Amat Gemilang Bintang Sarawak') was established by Charles Vyner Brooke, The Rajah of Sarawak, on 26 September 1928 as the highest order of chivalry within the Raj of Sarawak. The motto of the order was "Haraplah Sa-lagi Bernafas", which was also the Sarawak state motto, a translation of the Latin phrase Dum Spiro Spero, which literally means "As long as I breathe, I hope".
 
When instituted the order had a dual status as a dynastic order of knighthood as well as a state order with the Rajah as the Sovereign of the order. It had a bright yellow ribbon with a black line down the centre. When Sarawak became of a British colony in 1946 the Rajah stopped making appointments and with the death of the last known recipient, Elizabeth Choy in 2006, the order became dormant.
 
In 1964, the post-independence government of Sarawak created a new order with a simpler name The Most Illustrious Order of the Star of Sarawak (Darjah Yang Amat Mulia Bintang Sarawak), and in 1988, they renamed it as the Most Exalted Order of the Star of Sarawak, or Darjah Utama Yang Amat Mulia Bintang Sarawak in Malay. However, the revived order has no connection whatsoever with the previous order except for the name.

Composition
The Order consisted of:
 
 Sovereign
 Grand Master
 
The three ordinary ranks of members are:
 
 Master (MSS)-consists of breast star, sash, and sash badge.
 Companion (CSS)-a badge worn from a necklet.
 Officer (OSS)-a badge worn from a medal ribbon on the left breast.

References

External links

Star of Sarawak